Dareyn may refer to:
 Dareyn, Razavi Khorasan
 Dareyn, Yazd